Within the history of Yemen, Al-Hasan Badr al-Din ibn Abdallah was the 17th Tayyibi Isma'ili Dāʿī al-Muṭlaq in Yemen. He succeeded his father Abdallah Fakhr al-Din in 1407, and held the post until his death in 1418, when he was succeeded by his brother Ali Shams al-Din II.

Life
Al-Hasan Badr al-Din became Da'i al-Mutlaq in 809AH /1345AD. His period of Dawat was from 809-821AH (1406-1418 AD) for about 12 years (Hijri), 27 days.

His
Mawazeen: Syedi Abdul Muttalib Najmuddin, Al Maula Mohammad bin Idris, 
Mukasir: Syedi Ahmad bin Syedna Abdullah (his younger brother)

Death
The grave of the Dāʿī along with those of the 14th and 16th Dāʿīs are at Zimarmar Fort in Yemen, on the top of the hill. The small square is grave of their associates (mazoon). On the hill top there still exist remains of Mosque of Sultan Ali Bin Hatim, buildings and water reservoirs. Syedna Al-Hasan janaza prayers were led by his son Syedna Idris Imad al-Din.

Succession
He was succeeded by the 18th Dai Syedna Ali Shams al-Din II son of the 16th Dai Syedna Abdallah Fakhr al-Din. His son succeeded the 18th Dai as the 19th Dai Syedna Idris Imad al-Din.

Gallery

References

Sources
 
 

1418 deaths
Year of birth unknown
Banu al-Walid al-Anf
Tayyibi da'is
Burials in Yemen
15th-century monarchs in the Middle East
15th century in Yemen
15th-century Arabs
15th-century Ismailis
15th-century Islamic religious leaders